The men's snowboard slopestyle competition of the FIS Freestyle Ski and Snowboarding World Championships 2015 was held at Kreischberg, Austria on January 19 (qualifying)  and January 21 (finals). 
50 athletes from 20 countries competed.

Qualification
The following are the results of the qualification.

Semifinal
The following are the results of the semifinal.

Final
The following are the results of the finals.

References

Snowboard slopestyle, men's